Cerithidea is a genus of medium-sized sea snails or mud snails, marine gastropod mollusks in the family Potamididae, the horn snails.

Species
There used to be three subgenera in the genus Cerithidea: subgenus Cerithea, subgenus Cerithideopsis and subgenus Cerithideopsilla. These have been brought to the status of genus.

 Cerithidea andamanensis Reid, 2014
 Cerithidea anticipata Iredale, 1929
 Cerithidea balteata A. Adams, 1855
 † Cerithidea bifurcata Kilburn & Tankard, 1975 
 Cerithidea charbonnieri (Petit de la Saussaye, 1851)
 Cerithidea decollata (Linnaeus, 1758) 
 Cerithidea dohrni (Kobelt, 1890)
 Cerithidea houbricki Reid, 2014
 † Ceruthidea kanpokuensis<ref> (26 August 2007) [http://www.geocities.jp/higatakaseki/tubuyaki/kanpokuensis/cerithidea-kanpokuensis.htm "Cerithidea kanpokuensis カンポクヘナタリ"], accessed 28 January 2011.</ref>
 Cerithidea moerchii (A. Adams, 1855)
 † Cerithidea nebrascensis (Meek & Hayden, 1856) 
 Cerithidea obtusa (Lamarck, 1822) - type species
 Cerithidea quoyii (Hombron & Jacquinot, 1848)
 Cerithidea reidi Houbrick, 1986
 Cerithidea rhizophorarum A. Adams, 1855WoRMS (2010). Cerithidea rhizophorarum A. Adams, 1855. Accessed through: World Register of Marine Species at http://www.marinespecies.org/aphia.php?p=taxdetails&id=456560 on 2011-01-28
 Cerithidea sinensis (Philippi, 1848)
 Cerithidea tonkiniana Mabille, 1887
 Cerithidea weyersi Dautzenberg, 1899

Species brought into synonymy
 Cerithidea alata (Philippi, 1849): synonym of Pirenella alata (Philippi, 1849)
 Cerithidea albonodosa Gould & Carpenter, 1857: synonym of Cerithideopsis californica (Haldeman, 1840)
 Cerithidea alternata Hutton, 1873: synonym of Batillaria australis (Quoy & Gaimard, 1834)
 Cerithidea bombayana G. B. Sowerby II, 1866: synonym of Pirenella conica (Blainville, 1829)
 Cerithidea californica (Haldeman, 1840): synonym of Cerithideopsis californica (Haldeman, 1840)
 Cerithidea caiyingyai Qian Z.-X., Fang Y.-F. & He J., 2013: synonym of Pirenella caiyingyai (Qian, Fang & He, 2013)
 Cerithidea cingulata (Gmelin, 1791):WoRMS (2010). Cerithidea cingulata (Gmelin, 1791). Accessed through: World Register of Marine Species at http://www.marinespecies.org/aphia.php?p=taxdetails&id=456564 on 2011-01-28 synonym of Cerithideopsilla cingulata (Gmelin, 1791) accepted as Pirenella cingulata (Gmelin, 1791
 Cerithidea cornea A. Adams, 1855: synonym of Cerithidea balteata A. Adams, 1855
 Cerithidea costata (da Costa, 1778): synonym of Cerithideopsis costata (da Costa, 1778)
 Cerithidea crassilabrum A. Adams, 1855: synonym of Cerithideopsis scalariformis (Say, 1825)
 Cerithidea dahlakensis Biggs, 1965: synonym of Bittium proteum (Jousseaume, 1931)
 Cerithidea djadjariensis (K. Martin, 1899): synonym of Cerithideopsilla djadjariensis (K. Martin, 1899)
 Cerithidea fluviatilis (Potiez & Michaud, 1838): synonym of Pirenella cingulata (Gmelin, 1791)
 Cerithidea fortunei A. Adams, 1855: synonym of Cerithideopsis largillierti (Philippi, 1848)
 Cerithidea fuscata Gould, 1857 - this species has probably become extinct in recent times: synonym of Cerithideopsis californica (Haldeman, 1840)
 Cerithidea hanleyana: synonym of  G. B. Sowerby II, 1866: synonym of Cerithideopsis costata (da Costa, 1778)
 Cerithidea largillierti (Philippi, 1848): synonym of Cerithideopsis largillierti (Philippi, 1848)
 Cerithidea layardii A. Adams, 1855: synonym of Pirenella conica (Blainville, 1829)
 Cerithidea mazatlanica Carpenter, 1857: synonym of Cerithideopsis californica (Haldeman, 1840)
 Cerithidea microptera (Kiener, 1842): synonym of Pirenella microptera (Kiener, 1841)
 Cerithidea montagnei (d'Orbigny, 1841): synonym of Cerithideopsis montagnei (d’Orbigny, 1841)
 Cerithidea multicostata Schepman, 1919: synonym of Cerithidea anticipata Iredale, 1929
 Cerithidea mutata Pilsbry & Vanatta, 1902: synonym of Batillaria mutata (Pilsbry & Vanatta, 1902)
 Cerithidea ornata A. Adams, 1863: synonym of Cerithidea balteata A. Adams, 1855
 Cerithidea pauxilla A. Adams, 1855: synonym for Varicopeza pauxilla (A. Adams, 1855)
 Cerithidea pliculosa (Menke, 1829): synonym of Cerithideopsis pliculosa (Menke, 1829)
 Cerithidea pulchra (C. B. Adams, 1852): synonym of Cerithideopsis pulchra (C. B. Adams, 1852)
 Cerithidea quadrata G. B. Sowerby II, 1866: synonym of Cerithidea quoyii (Hombron & Jacquinot, 1848)
 Cerithidea raricostata A. Adams, 1855: synonym of Cerithidea balteata A. Adams, 1855
 Cerithidea rollei Kobelt, 1890: synonym of Cerithideopsis scalariformis (Say, 1825)
 Cerithidea scalariformis (Say, 1825): synonym of Cerithideopsis scalariformis (Say, 1825)
 Cerithidea tenkatei Schepman, 1893: synonym of Terebralia palustris (Linnaeus, 1767)
 Cerithidea valida (C. B. Adams, 1852): synonym of Cerithideopsis californica (Haldeman, 1840)

References

 Sowerby, G.B. II (1866) Monograph of the genus Cerithidea. In: Reeve, L.A. (Ed.), Conchologia Iconica. Vol. 15. L.A. Reeve, London, pls 1–4.
 Oyama, K. (1959) Cerithidea. In: Oyama, K. (Ed.), The Molluscan Shells. Vol. 2. Resources Exploitation Institute, Tokyo
 Houbrick, R.S. (1984) Revision of higher taxa in genus Cerithidea (Mesogastropoda: Potamididae) based on comparative morphology and biological data. American Malacological Bulletin, 2, 1–20
 Hasegawa, K. (2000) Family Potamididae. In: Okutani, T., (Ed.), Marine Mollusks in Japan. Tokai University Press, Tokyo
 Lozouet, P. (2008) Potamididae. In: Poppe, G.T. (Ed.), Philippine Marine Mollusks. Vol. 1. ConchBooks, Hackenheim, pp. 284–287
 Reid, D.G., Claremont, M., Smith, L., Shamoto, M., Glaubrecht, M. & Ozawa, T. (2013) Mosaics in the mangroves: allopatric diversification of tree-climbing mudwhelks (Gastropoda: Potamididae: Cerithidea) in the Indo-West Pacific''. Biological Journal of the Linnean Society, 110, 564–580
 Reid, D.G. (2014) The genus Cerithidea Swainson, 1840 (Gastropoda: Potamididae) in the Indo-West Pacific region. Zootaxa, 3775 (1), 1–65

External links 
 

Potamididae
Gastropod genera